Mid Glamorganshire was a county constituency in Glamorganshire, Wales.  It returned one Member of Parliament (MP) to the House of Commons of the Parliament of the United Kingdom, elected by the first past the post system.

Overview

The constituency was created by the Redistribution of Seats Act 1885 for the 1885 general election, as a result of the division of the old two-member Glamorgan county constituency into five seats. The new constituency had an overwhelmingly working-class electorate. It was abolished for the 1918 general election.

Boundaries 
Created in the redistribution of seats in 1885 & from the old Glamorganshire constituency which had been in existence since 1541, the seat covered a wide area that included Maesteg, Llangeinor, Llynfi Valley, Aberpergwm, Margam Park, Briton Ferry, Glyncorrwg, Resolven. It was scrapped in the next redistribution of seats that took place in 1918.

History

C.R.M. Talbot
Following the creation of the seat in 1885, this predominantly mining constituency, which included the Llyfni, Garw and Ogmore valleys, was initially represented by the Lord Lieutenant of Glamorgan, Christopher Rice Mansel Talbot, who had served as a member for the Glamorgan county seat since 1830. Despite his venerable status, a meeting of the Liberal Association held at Maesteg initially considered other candidates including Gwilym Williams and J. Carvell Williams. Although a leading member of the county aristocracy, Talbot did at this time support the principle of electing working men to parliament, especially in mining constituencies, and endorsed the efforts of the Rhondda miners to have William Abraham (Mabon) selected as Liberal candidate for the new Rhondda constituency.

Despite adopting a number of Gladstonian principles, Talbot remained opposed to Irish Home Rule, and this was inevitably going to present a difficulty at the 1886 general election. There was criticism of Talbot's views in the more industrial parts of the constituency, such as the Maesteg area. He wrote to his fellow county member, Hussey Vivian, that he had a meeting with Maesteg Liberals and although they were friendly to his face, 'I am told that [they] became quarrelsome after I left, and suggested various substitutes'. A number of alternative candidates were suggested, including Abel Thomas, John Cory, Thomas Williams of Merthyr, R.D. Burnie and  Cyril Flower. However, none of these was prepared to consent to be nominated in opposition to Talbot. Some few weeks later, however, a meeting of the Association at Briton Ferry which, significantly, was not attended by delegates from some industrial districts, unanimously re-adopted Talbot, stating that he had 'made great progress towards the views they, as an association, held'.

Samuel T. Evans
Upon Talbot's death in 1890, his successor was Samuel Thomas Evans, a grocer's son from Skewen who was initially a militant nonconformist radical and supporter of Welsh Home Rule through Cymru Fydd. Evans, however, later toned down his radicalism on achieving ministerial office.

Members of Parliament

Elections

Elections in the 1880s

Elections in the 1890s

Elections in the 1900s

Evans is appointed Recorder of Swansea, prompting a by-election.

Evans is appointed Solicitor-General, prompting a by-election.

Elections in the 1910s

Evans is appointed president of the probate, divorce and admiralty division of the High Court of Justice, prompting a by-election.

General Election 1914–15

Another General Election was scheduled to take place before the end of 1915. The political parties had been making preparations for an election to take place and by the July 1914, the following candidates had been selected; 
Liberal: Hugh Edwards
Labour: Vernon Hartshorn
Unionist:

See also
 List of parliamentary constituencies in Mid Glamorgan
Boundary Commission Map Report from 1885 showing detailed original maps used
 A map of Glamorganshire in 1885, showing its new divisions.
The National Library for Wales:Dictionary of Welsh Biography (John Hugh Edwards)
The National Library for Wales:Dictionary of Welsh Biography (Frederick William Gibbins)
The National Library for Wales:Dictionary of Welsh Biography (Samuel Thomas Evans)
The National Library for Wales:Dictionary of Welsh Biography (Vernon Hartshorn)

Notes and references

Sources

Books and Journals
 
 
 

History of Glamorgan
Historic parliamentary constituencies in South Wales
Constituencies of the Parliament of the United Kingdom established in 1885
Constituencies of the Parliament of the United Kingdom disestablished in 1918